A list of Christian music festivals around the world. A Christian music festival is a festival oriented towards genres of Christian music, such as gospel music, church music, liturgical music, or contemporary Christian music such as Christian pop and Christian rock. Festivals are held worldwide, and in North America many are overseen by organizations such as the Christian Festival Association.

Festivals by country

Australia

 Australian Gospel Music Festival
 Black Stump Music and Arts Festival

Austria

 KEY2LIFE Festival

Brazil

 Halleluya Festival

Canada

 Canada Berries Gospel Music Festival 
 Canada's Gospel Music Festival
 Festival of Praise
 No Greater Love Music Festival
 Toronto Christian Music Festival

Finland

 Joensuun Gospel Festival
 Maata Näkyvissä

Germany

 Christmas Rock Night
 Loud and Proud Festival

Israel 

 Gallelujah

Italy

Sanremo Festival della Canzone Cristiana
Euro Christian Music festival

Netherlands

 Cloud Festival
 EO Jongerendag
 Flevo Festival (now defunct)
 Graceland Festival
 
 Peacedog Festival (now defunct)

Portugal

Switzerland

 Big Boss' Festival

United Kingdom

 BigChurchDayOut
 Greenbelt Festival

United States

 Agape Music Festival
 Alive Festival
 Big Ticket Festival – Gaylord Michigan
 Clover Festival in Traverse City, Michigan
 Cornerstone Festival
 Cornerstone Florida
 Connect Fest – Jaffrey, NH
 Creation Festival – Shirleysburg, PA
 Faithfest – Wilkesboro, NC
 Greater Klamath CityFest – Klamath Falls, OR
 HeavenFest
 Hillfest – New Ipswich, NH
 Hills Alive – Rapid City, SD 
 Ichthus Music Festival
 Kingdom Bound – Buffalo, NY
 Legacy Five Wisconsin Gospel Music Festival
 Lifest
 Rural Music Festival Isle, MN
 Light The Way – Springfield, MO
 One Fest – Chippewa Falls, WI 
 Resound Festival  – Bethany, MO
 Risefest –  Sheldon, IA
 Rock The Universe – Orlando, FL
 SonRise – Virginia Beach, VA
 Soulfest – Northfield, MA 
 Unity Festival – Muskegon, MI 
 Uprise Festival – Shippensburg, PA

Gallery

See also

 List of gospel music festivals
 List of festivals
 Lists of festivals – festival list articles on Wikipedia
 Christian music
 List of Christian bands and artists by genre

References

External links

 Christian Music Festivals

Christian
and
Lists of religious festivals
Christian
Christian
Christian